Alec Riddolls (26 October 1908 – 18 May 1963) was a New Zealand cricketer. He played in one first-class match for Wellington in 1941/42.

See also
 List of Wellington representative cricketers

References

External links
 

1908 births
1963 deaths
New Zealand cricketers
Wellington cricketers
Cricketers from Burnley